
Charles M. McMillen (1854–1911) was an Irish born architect notable for his work in Duluth, Minnesota and Wilmington, North Carolina. He often designed buildings in Richardsonian Romanesque and other styles.

He won a competition in 1898 to design the Masonic Temple in Wilmington, North Carolina, and moved there. It was reported in the Wilmington Messenger newspaper that he had by then designed 14 Masonic Temple buildings. He designed in North Carolina for about 10 years.

Works include:
Old Masonic Temple, Duluth, Minnesota
Messenger and Southern Bell Telephone and Telegraph Building (1899), Wilmington, North Carolina
Murchison National Bank (1902), Wilmington
Southern Building (1905), Wilmington
I.M. Bear Building (1906), Wilmington
Carolina Yacht Club, near Wilmington
Wright-Harriss Bellamy House, renovation from Italianate to Queen Anne style
Bridgers House 1905)
Masonic Temple, Wilmington, North Carolina
Grand Lodge Masonic Temple, Raleigh, North Carolina

References

Further reading
Lost Duluth: Landmarks, Industries, Buildings, Homes, and the Neighborhoods in Which They Stood, 2011, Zenith City Press, Duluth, Minnesota

External links
 Biography on North Carolina Architects and Builders at North Carolina State University Library
 Zenith City Online: Charles M. McMillen, at Zenith City History, Duluth, Minnesota]

Architects from North Carolina
1854 births
1911 deaths
Irish architects